Adriane Garcia (September 19, 1983) is a Brazilian TV presenter, actress and former pop singer-songwriter. She has lived in Lisbon, Portugal since 2005.

Career
Since she was a child, Adriane Garcia has always been passionate about music. At 14 she began a career as a model, but it was only years later that her life changed. After she had some interests in soap operas and mini-TV-series, Adriane was a reporter at SporTV in Brazil. In 2002 she joined SBT reality show Casa dos Artistas 3. Adriane was chosen to live in the house, where she stayed for 45 days. Her obvious interest in pursuing a career in music, Adriane was probed by Building Records to record some demo songs. As a result, the label approved her work and the same year Adriane began recording her first album.

Later Garcia took part in the third session of the Brazilian reality show Casa dos Artistas. She then released her debut album, Vem Ficar Comigo, in early 2004. In 2007 she was chosen as the presenter for the Record Internacional's TV show Sucesso, in Portugal.

As the first Brazilian at all she is working now as TV Presenter for Rádio e Televisão de Portugal. In April 2012 she posed for fashion magazine Maxim in Portugal.

Filmography

Discography

Albums

Singles

References

External links
 

1983 births
Brazilian dance musicians
Brazilian television presenters
Living people
Singers from São Paulo
Musicians from Rio de Janeiro (city)
21st-century Brazilian singers
21st-century Brazilian women singers
Brazilian women television presenters